The  Jakobikirche  was a High Rhenish Neo-Romanesque church built in Dresden between 1898 and 1901 to plans by Jürgen Kröger. It was destroyed by bombing in the Second World War and its ruins were demolished in 1953.

References 

Former churches in Dresden
Romanesque Revival church buildings in Germany
Buildings and structures in Germany destroyed during World War II
Buildings and structures demolished in 1953